is the third full-length album released by the Japanese boyband Kanjani Eight. Puzzle was released almost two years after the release of their second album, KJ2 Zukkoke Dai Dassō. There were two versions of this release, a regular edition and a CD+DVD limited edition. First press of the regular edition came with a photobook containing pictures from the making of the unit promotional videos, the normal edition came with member solos, and the limited edition CD+DVD came with a DVD documenting the making of the album, creation of the units, and music videos for each unit.

The music's style is, again, unlike its predecessor. Out of all the albums released by the group, "Puzzle" is considerably the most "modern" sounding album of the bunch compared to KJ1 F.T.O which was primarily an 80s era pop sound and to KJ2 Zukkoke Dai Dassou's 70s era pop sound. The album is well diverse, with a blended balance of R&B, pop, rock, and slow ballads that present the group in a more mature, "boyband", sounding nature than their more notorious "comedy" sound. Jouya Uenaka of The Inazuma Sentai returned to write for the album, producing the group's biggest to date, "Musekinin Hero", as well as writing every rock song on the album.

Kanjani Eight had a more creative control over the album, selecting from around 60 demos to sing for the album. Nishikido had personally requested Kazuyoshi Saito to write the title track of the album for the group.

The member solos were all written and/or composed by the group themselves as well as for the special units for the album. The units themselves were picked out through a game of Jan Ken Pon during the night of their NTV Best Hit Artist 2008 performance.

CD Track listing

CD 1

CD 2

Charts

References

2009 albums
Kanjani Eight albums